The 1979 World Championship Tennis Finals was a men's professional tennis tournament played on indoor carpet courts. It was the 9th edition of the WCT Finals and was part of the 1979 Colgate-Palmolive Grand Prix. It was played at the Moody Coliseum in Dallas, Texas in the United States and was held from May 1 through May 6, 1979. Third-seeded John McEnroe won the title.

Final

Singles

 John McEnroe defeated  Björn Borg 7–5, 4–6, 6–2, 7–6(7–5) 
 It was McEnroe's 5th singles title of the year and the 9th of his career.

See also
 1979 Colgate-Palmolive Masters
 Borg–McEnroe rivalry

References

 
World Championship Tennis Finals
World Championship Tennis
World Championship Tennis Finals
World Championship Tennis Finals
WCT Finals